Vexillum balicasagense is a species of sea snail, a marine gastropod mollusk, in the family Costellariidae, the ribbed miters.

Description
The length of the shell attains 15.6 mm

Distribution
This marine species occurs off the Philippines.

References

 Salisbury, R. A.; Guillot de Suduiraut, E. (2006). Five new Costellariidae from the Philippine Islands taken by tangle net fisherman (Gastropoda: Muricoidea: Costellariidae). Visaya. 1(6): 90-103

balicasagense
Gastropods described in 2006